

Events
6 January – Rob Elliott now takes over from John Burgess as host of Wheel of Fortune, after the failed attempt last year with long-time Sale of the Century quizmaster Tony Barber as host. The programme starts 1997 without Adriana Xenides, as she takes a long- term leave as the letter turner due to a cancerous breakdown. She would return to the puzzleboard in July. Her place is filled by ex-Perfect Match hostess Kerrie Friend. After a notable absence throughout 1996 due in part to hosting Family Feud for the last remainder of the year, John Deeks returns to the booth as announcer – the position had been held by David Day in Adelaide, and Ron E Sparks in Sydney.
3 February – Australian drama serial Heartbreak High switches over to air on ABC at 6:00 pm from Monday to Thursdays.
31 March – A brand new Australian game show called Burgo's Catch Phrase hosted by former Wheel of Fortune presenter John Burgess starts screening on Nine Network.
13 June – Australian children's television series Bananas in Pyjamas appears for the first time in Singapore on Channel 5.
26 June – British sitcom Mr. Bean starring Rowan Atkinson as the titular character switches over to the Seven Network a year after finishing up on the ABC.
29 June – The 1993 film In the Line of Fire starring Clint Eastwood and John Malkovich premieres on the Nine Network.
1 July – Prime Television comes to Mildura, ending a monopoly on commercial television held by STV-8 since 1965.
8 July – Ownership of Australia Television International moves from ABC to Seven Network.
8 July – American animated series Hey Arnold! makes its debut on ABC.
11 July – American-Canadian children's animated series Arthur debuts on ABC. The series is still broadcast on ABC Kids as of 2022.
4 August – Judge Judy makes it debut on Network Ten.
1 September – Cult Sitcom The Adventures of Lano and Woodley starring comedians Colin Lane and Frank Woodley premieres on the ABC.
September – Jo Beth Taylor resigns as host of Australia's Funniest Home Video Show as part of the show's biggest hosts in history – she is replaced by Getaway reporter, Catriona Rowntree, and then axed.
22 September – A reboot of the classic Australian 1980s sitcom Kingswood Country called Bullpitt! once again starring Ross Higgins as Ted Bullpitt airs on Seven Network.
11 October – In Neighbours, Helen Daniels dies in her sleep at a family get together. The last ever of the original 1985 cast members Anne Haddy departs the series, she died two years later after a long illness.
12 October – American sitcom Everybody Loves Raymond debuts on the Seven Network.
1 November – TCN-9 stages the first trial of digital television in the Southern Hemisphere.
16 November – The 1994 Film Forrest Gump starring Tom Hanks premieres on the Nine Network.
23 November – American animated comedy series King of the Hill screens on the Seven Network at 7:30 pm.
3 December – American supernatural fiction, fantasy, action, horror series Buffy the Vampire Slayer debuts on the Seven Network.
20 December – American animated comedy series South Park airs on SBS. It also became the network's highest rating series to date.
December – Prime Television acquires the rights to Canal 9 in Argentina.
The funeral of Diana, Princess of Wales is broadcast live on the ABC and all commercial free-to-air television channels.
The Sydney Gay and Lesbian Mardi Gras is televised for the first time on commercial television.

Channels

New channels
 1 June – Ovation Channel
 1 July – Odyssey Channel
 1 September – The LifeStyle Channel 
 7 September – Movie Extra

Rebranded channels
 20 March – MTV Australia (was ARC Music Channel)
 18 April – Channel V Australia (was Red)
 7 September – Movie One (was The Movie Network)

Debuts

Domestic

International

Subscription television

Domestic

International

Subscription premieres
This is a list of programs which made their premiere on Australian subscription television that had previously premiered on Australian free-to-air television. Programs may still air on the original free-to-air television network.

International

Changes to network affiliation
This is a list of programs which made their premiere on an Australian television network that had premiered on another Australian television network. The networks involved in the switch of allegiances are predominantly both free-to-air networks or both subscription television networks. Programs that have their free-to-air/subscription television premiere, after having premiered on the opposite platform (free-to air to subscription/subscription to free-to air) are not included. In some cases, programs may still air on the original television network. This occurs predominantly with programs shared between subscription television networks.

Domestic

International

Television shows

ABC
 Mr. Squiggle and Friends (1959–1999)
 Four Corners (1961–present)

Seven Network
 Wheel of Fortune (1981–1996, 1996–2003, 2004–2008)
 Home and Away (1988–present)
 Blue Heelers (1994–2006)
 The Great Outdoors (1993–present)
 Today Tonight (1995–present)

Nine Network
 Today (1982–present)
 Sale of the Century (1980–2001)
 A Current Affair (1971–1978, 1988–present)
 Hey Hey It's Saturday (1971–1999)
 Midday (1985–1998)
 60 Minutes (1979–present)
 Australia's Funniest Home Video Show (1990–2000, 2000–2004, 2005–present)
 The AFL Footy Show (1994–present)
 The NRL Footy Show (1994–present)
 Water Rats (1996–2001)
 Burgo's Catch Phrase (1997–2001, 2002–2004)
 The Price is Right (1993–1998, 2003–2005, 2012)

Network Ten
 Neighbours (Seven Network 1985, Network Ten 1986–present)
 GMA with Bert Newton (1991–2005)

Ending / Resting this year

See also
 1997 in Australia
 List of Australian films of 1997

References